Scyrotis matoposensis is a species of moth of the  family Cecidosidae. It is found in Zimbabwe.

References

Endemic fauna of Zimbabwe
Cecidosidae
Lepidoptera of Zimbabwe
Moths of Sub-Saharan Africa